The Ohio Amateur Championship hosted annually by the Ohio Golf Association (OGA) visits the a variety of courses in the state. The event is open to amateur golfers who are residents of the state of Ohio or attending a state university or college in Ohio. The first OGA event was held at the Cleveland Country Club and has been played annually since 1904 and involves four rounds of stroke play.

Winners

2020 Austin Greaser
2019 Maxwell Moldovan
2018 Brandon Hoelzer
2017 Austin Sipe
2016 Ryan Troyer
2015 Joo Young Lee
2014 Andrew Dorn
2013 Andrew Dorn
2012 Nathan Kern
2011 Korey Ward
2010 Michael Bernard
2009 Alex Martin
2008 Vaughn Snyder
2007 Jason Kokrak
2006 Jason Kokrak
2005 Chris Wilson
2004 Kyle Reifers
2003 Steven Paramore
2002 Kevin Kornowa
2001 Robert Gerwin
2000 Ben Curtis
1999 Ben Curtis
1998 Matt Ehlinger
1997 Andrew Montooth
1996 Robert Gerwin
1995 Alan Fadel
1994 Eric Frishette
1993 Robert Fairchild
1992 Randy Reifers
1991 Jeff Junk
1990 Steve Anderson
1989 Rob Moss
1988 Barry Fabyan
1987 Peter Hammar
1986 Randy Reifers
1985 Karl Zoller
1984 Jim Muething
1983 Brian Mogg
1982 Brian Fogt
1981 John Hamrick
1980 Rocky Miller
1979 John Cook
1978 John Cook
1977 Gary Trivisonno
1976 Taylor Metcalfe
1975 Rick Jones
1974 Kim Heisler
1973 Steve Groves
1972 Ludwig Schenk
1971 Jack Hesler
1970 Mike McCullough
1969 Gary Artz
1968 Bob Lewis
1967 Lalu Sabotin
1966 Bobby Littler
1965 Richard Flockenzier
1964 Carl Unis
1963 Robert Bourne
1962 Tony Blom
1961 Walter Stahl, Jr.
1960 Dan Carmichael
1959 Tony Blom
1958 Richard Schwartz
1957 Robert Ross
1956 Robert McCall
1955 Robert Rankin
1954 Arnold Palmer
1953 Arnold Palmer
1952 Francis Cardi
1951 Tom Jones, Jr.
1950 Harold Paddock Jr.
1949 Richard Evans
1948 Harold Paddock Jr.
1947 Robert Servis
1946 Edwin Preisler
1943–1945 No tournament due to World War II
1942 Frank Stranahan
1941 Frank Stranahan
1940 Robert Servis
1939 Robert Servis
1938 Maurice McCarthy
1937 Maurice McCarthy
1936 Robert Servis
1935 Neil Ransick
1934 Maurice McCarthy
1933 Robert Servis
1932 John Florio
1931 Robert Kepler
1930 Glen Bishop
1929 John Florio
1928 William Deuschle
1927 Denny Shute
1926 Parker Campbell
1925 Eddie Hasman
1924 Joe M. Wells
1923 Jack Munro
1922 Joe M. Wells
1921 Harold Weber
1920 Harold Weber
1919 DeWitt Balch
1918 Jack Munro
1917 Howard Hollinger
1916 Ira Holden
1915 Holland Hubbard
1914 Joe K. Bole
1913 Harold Weber
1912 DeWitt Balch
1911 Russell Jones
1910 Joe K. Bole
1909 Joe K. Bole
1908 T Sterling Beckwith
1907 Harold Weber
1906 Robert H. Crowell
1905 Charles H. Stanley
1904 T. Sterling Beckwith

References

External links
Past Champions for Ohio Amateur
Ohio Amateur golf championship winners
Ohio Amateur Championship Has Storied History
Ohio Amateur Championships Driven by Innova

Amateur golf tournaments in the United States
Golf in Ohio
Recurring sporting events established in 1904